European Carnage Tour was a European tour headlined by American thrash metal bands Slayer and Megadeth. This tour marked the first time that both bands had toured Europe together since the Clash of the Titans Tour in 1990 when support was provided by Testament and Suicidal Tendencies. Slayer and Megadeth had previously toured together in North America on American Carnage Tour in 2010, with Testament and Anthrax as the supporting acts.

Gary Holt of Exodus was announced as Jeff's temporary replacement, in Slayer, on March 13, to April 4, 2011.
 
There would have been a Swedish concert originally in Stockholm, Arenan, but the concert was cancelled, and a newer Norwegian show was announced instead, in Oslo, Sentrum Scene, on March 20, 2011.
The Switzerland show previously scheduled at St. Jakobshalle in Basel, on April 13, 2011 got been moved to the Volkshaus in Zurich.

In Saint Petersburg on March 16, 2011, Megadeth performance was cut short due to Dave Mustaine's illness.

Cannibal Corpse guitarist Pat O'Brien filled in for Exodus' Gary Holt when Holt left the Slayer European tour to play with his own band Exodus at the Estadio Nacional in Santiago, Chile on April 10, 2011. Holt's last show with Slayer was on April 4, 2011 in Padova, Italy, O'Brien joined the band for the April 6, 2011 show in Croatia, and finished the European dates on April 14, 2011 in the Netherlands.

Tour Dates

Setlist

Opening Acts

El Caco (March 19–20, 2011)
Drums Are For Parades (March 23, 2011)
The Sorrow (March 24, April 7, 2011)
Zuul FX (March 26, 2011)
Angelus Apatrida (March 28–29, April 1, 2011)

Wako (March 30, 2011)
Sadist (April 3–4, 2011)
Malehookers (April 6, 2011)
Vader (April 11, 2011)
Diggeth (April 14, 2011)

Personnel

Slayer:
Kerry King - guitars
Tom Araya - bass, vocals
Dave Lombardo - drums
Gary Holt - guitars (March 13, 2011-April 6, 2011)
Pat O'Brien - guitars (April 6–14, 2011)

Megadeth:
 Dave Mustaine – guitars, lead vocals
 Chris Broderick – guitars, backing vocals
 Shawn Drover – drums, percussion
 David Ellefson – bass, backing vocals

References

External links
Official Slayer website
Official Megadeth website

2011 concert tours
Megadeth concert tours
Slayer concert tours